Kadir Nelson (May 15, 1974) is a Los Angeles–based painter, illustrator, and author who is best known for his paintings often featured on the covers of The New Yorker magazine, and album covers for Michael Jackson and Drake. His work is focused on African-American culture and history. The New York Times describes his work as: "sumptuous, deeply affecting work. Nelson’s paintings are drenched in ambience, and often overt symbolism. He has twice been a Caldecott honor recipient and won the 2020 Caldecott Medal for his book The Undefeated.

Career
In 1996, Nelson began his career as a conceptual artist for Steven Spielberg's feature film Amistad, and the animated feature film Spirit: Stallion of the Cimarron. Nelson has since designed several commemorative postage stamps for the United States Postal Service including stamps featuring Wilt Chamberlain, Joe Dimaggio, and Richard Wright. He has also authored and/or illustrated over 30 picture books including, Brothers of the Knight by actress Debbie Allen, WE ARE THE SHIP: The Story of Negro League Baseball, which was featured on the cover of Sports Illustrated magazine, and Heart and Soul: The Story of America and African Americans. In 2013, Nelson was commissioned to paint his first cover for The New Yorker magazine, a portrait of Nelson Mandela. Nelson has since created several memorable covers for the magazine including, Eustace Negro, Schomburg Center, Harlem, New York, and A Day at the Beach.

Early life and education
Nelson was born in Washington D.C., and grew up in Atlantic City, New Jersey and San Diego, California,  the son of author Emily Gunter and educator Lenwood Nelson. He received his early training in art from his uncle, Michael Morris, who is an artist and art instructor. Both his uncle and his high school art teacher taught him important artistic principles and techniques, including how to paint with oils. After developing an impressive portfolio during high school, Crawford High in San Diego, Kadir Nelson earned a partial scholarship to the prestigious Pratt Institute in Brooklyn, New York. Nelson earned his BFA from Pratt Institute in Brooklyn, New York in 1996.

Works
In August 1999, Nelson’s paintings depicting Negro league baseball scenes were featured in Sports Illustrated magazine on its opening Leading Off pages. They were some of the first paintings in a series of works that led to Nelson writing and illustrating a book commemorating the history of the Negro Baseball Leagues entitled, We Are the Ship: The Story of Negro Leagues Baseball, published by Jump at the Sun in 2008. Nelson’s critically acclaimed authorial debut was created over the span of seven years and earned Nelson the Sibert Medal, a Coretta Scott King Author Award and Illustrator Honor. We Are the Ship was released by Brilliance Audio as an audiobook in 2009, narrated by voice actor Dion Graham.

In 2008, Nelson was commissioned by the US House of Representatives to paint the official portrait of Representative Shirley Anita Chisholm. The original painting hangs in the US Capitol Building in Washington DC.

In 2017, Nelson was commissioned to paint a portrait of Henrietta Lacks to promote HBO’s upcoming film, The Immortal Life of Henrietta Lacks, based on the book by Rebecca Skloot. The painting was exhibited at the Reginald F. Lewis Museum in Baltimore, Maryland and other venues. The painting was later co-acquired by the Smithsonian museums National Portrait Gallery and the National Museum of African American History and Culture.

Album cover art
Nelson created the mural used as cover art for Swizz Beatz's 2002 album Swizz Beatz Presents G.H.E.T.T.O. Stories.

In 2005, Nelson was contacted by Michael Jackson to create a commissioned painting of the King of Pop’s life story. The commission was delayed and shelved for several years until the untimely death of the singer in 2009. Upon which Nelson was tapped to resume the portrait to be used later for the posthumously released album titled Michael. On Friday, December 10, 2010, a  poster depicting the Michael album artwork was erected at the Rectory Farm in Middlesex, England, which broke a Guinness World Record for the largest poster in the world.

In 2013, Nelson was contacted by recording artist Drake to create two covers for his album Nothing Was the Same. The album artwork became a signature work for the recording artist, and the subject of multiple internet memes. The album remained on the Billboard 200 sales chart for more than 400 weeks after its release in 2013.

Recognition and honors
Nelson has received multiple Gold and Silver Medals from the New York Society of Illustrators. In February 2014, Nelson was awarded the Hamilton King Award for best illustration of the year. Nelson is also the recipient of three NAACP Image Awards for his illustrated picture books, and the New York Times Best Illustrated Book for We Are The Ship: The Story of Negro League Baseball.

Nelson is a two-time Caldecott Honor Award winner. In 2020, Nelson won the Caldecott Medal and Coretta Scott King Award for his illustrations in The Undefeated. He received an NAACP Image Award for the book Just the Two of Us. For his book, We Are the Ship: The Story of Negro League Baseball, he received the 2008 CASEY Award for best baseball book, the 2009 Coretta Scott King Author Award, and the 2009 Robert F. Sibert Informational Book Award. His book, Nelson Mandela, was a Coretta Scott King Honor book in 2014.

Exhibitions
Nelson has had exhibitions in galleries and museums throughout the United States and the world, including the Muskegon Museum of Art, Chicago Art Institute, and The Studio Museum in Harlem.

Kadir Nelson's portrait of Henrietta Lacks was recently jointly acquired by The Smithsonian's National Portrait Gallery and the National Museum of African American History and Culture. Lacks' portrait was commissioned by HBO.

Bibliography
Illustrations only unless otherwise indicated.
  Brothers of the Knight by Debbie Allen. Dial, 1999.
  Big Jabe by Jerdine Nolen. HarperCollins, 2000.
  Salt in His Shoes: Michael Jordan in Pursuit of a Dream  by Deloris and Roslyn Jordan. Simon & Schuster, 2000.
  Dancing in the Wings, Debbie Allen. Dial, 2000.
  Just the Two of Us by Will Smith. Scholastic, 2001.(NAACP Image Award)
  Please, Baby, Please by Spike and Tonya Lee. Simon & Schuster, 2002.
  Under the Christmas Tree by Nikki Grimes. HarperCollins, 2002.
  The Village that Vanished by Ann Grifalconi. Dial, 2002.
 Thunder Rose by Jerdine Nolen. Harcourt, 2003.
 Ellington Was Not a Street by Ntozake Shange. Simon & Schuster, 2004. (Coretta Scott King Author Award)
  He’s Got the Whole World in His Hands, illustrated by Kadir Nelson, based on the traditional song lyrics. Dial, 2005.
  The Real Slam Dunk by Charisse Richardson. Dial, 2005.
Hewitt Anderson’s Great Big Life by Jerdine Nolen. Simon & Schuster, 2005.
 Please, Puppy, Please by Spike and Tonya Lee. Simon & Schuster, 2005.
  Moses: When Harriet Tubman Led Her People to Freedom, by Carole Boston Weatherford, Hyperion/Jump at the Sun, 2006 (2007 Caldecott Honor book)
 Henry's Freedom Box: A True Story from the Underground Railroad, Ellen Levine. Scholastic, 2007.(2008 Caldecott Honor book)
 Michael's Golden Rules by Deloris Jordan, introduction by Michael Jordan. Simon & Schuster, 2007.
 We Are the Ship:The Story of Negro League Baseball, written and illustrated by Kadir Nelson, foreword by Hank Aaron, Hyperion/Jump at the Sun, 2008.
 Abe's Hones Words, by Doreen Rappaport. Hyperion, 2008. 
 Change Has Come: An Artist Celebrates Our American Spirit, quotations from Barack Obama, black and white line drawings by Kadir Nelson. New York: Simon & Schuster, 2009. 
 Testing the Ice: A True Story About Jackie Robinson, by Sharon Robinson, Scholastic, 2009;  
 All God's Critters, song lyrics by Bill Staines, Simon & Schuster, 2009
 Mama Miti: Wangari Maathai and the Trees of Kenya, by Donna Jo Napoli, Simon & Schuster/Paula Wiseman Books, 2010, 
 A Nation's Hope: The Story of Boxing Legend Joe Louis, by Matt de la Peña, Dial Books, 2011, 
 Nelson Mandela, written and illustrated by Kadir Nelson, 2013, 
 Baby Bear, written and illustrated by Kadir Nelson, 2014, 
 If You Plant a Seed, written and illustrated by Kadir Nelson, 2015, 
 
 Blue Sky, White Stars, written by Sarvinder Naberhaus and illustrated by Kadir Nelson, 2017, 
 The Undefeated, written by Kwame Alexander and illustrated by Kadir Nelson, 2019,

See also

References

External links
 
 Nelson at AALBC.com
 Nelson at publisher Simon and Schuster
 Nelson at publisher HarperCollins
 Nelson at publisher Scholastic
 We Are the Ship children's book website
 Nelson biography, with further links, at Black Art Depot
 Nelson audio interview from December 3, 2007, at Children's Book Radio website
 
 Interview about Change Has Come at YouTube (Simon & Schuster videos)
 Nelson at 2009 National Book Festival, Library of Congress

20th-century American painters
21st-century American painters
21st-century American male artists
African-American illustrators
Album-cover and concert-poster artists
American children's book illustrators
American graphic designers
American male painters
American production designers
American stamp designers
Artists from San Diego
Caldecott Medal winners
Children's non-fiction writers
Living people
Painters from California
Painters from Washington, D.C.
Pratt Institute alumni
The New Yorker people
1974 births
20th-century African-American painters
21st-century African-American artists
20th-century American male artists
Robert F. Sibert Informational Book Medal winners